Barse was a punk rock band from Stanley in the North East of England, noted for its '77 sound. The guitarist and vocalist Gary 'Gash' Brown died in December 2006.

The band's releases received critical acclaim from Maximumrocknroll, AMP and Noise.fi.

Discography

Albums 
 Negative Reaction (CD, 2000, Savage Amusement)
 They Said it Couldn't Happen Here... and it Didn't! (LP / CD, 2002, Hell's Tone Records)
 If You Can't Fuck 'Em, Cut Em Up! (CD, 2007, Hell's Tone Records)

Compilations 
 Singles and Rarities (CD, 2008, Hell's Tone Records

EPs 
 Hardcore Pissing Stories (Tape, 2001, self-released)
 Split with Heartburns (7" vinyl, 2006, Hell's Tone Records)

Singles 
 "Council Estate" (7" vinyl, 2002, Rapid Pulse Records)
 "Better Be Ready" (7" vinyl, 2003, Hell's Tone Records)

References 

English punk rock groups
Musical groups established in 1997